Little brown bird (LBB) or little brown job (LBJ) is an informal name used by birdwatchers for any of the large number of species of small brown passerine birds, many of which are notoriously difficult to distinguish. This is especially true for females, which lack much of the coloring present in males.

The name little brown bat is also applied to records in general observations of microchiropteran species, many of which are indistinguishable by their greyish brown coloring.

See also
Damned yellow composite, a similar term for the numerous difficult-to-identify dandelion-like plants
Little brown mushroom, a similar term for difficult-to-identify mushrooms

References 

Birdwatching
Slang